Lindsay Davenport defeated the three-time defending champion Martina Hingis in the final, 6–1, 7–5 to win the women's singles tennis title at the 2000 Australian Open.  It was her first Australian Open title and her third and last major singles title. She did not lose a set during the tournament. Hingis' loss ended her 27-match win streak at the Australian Open, dating back to 1997.

Seeds

Qualifying

Draw

Finals

Top half

Section 1

Section 2

Section 3

Section 4

Bottom half

Section 5

Section 6

Section 7

Section 8

Singles overview

Women's singles

External links
 2000 Australian Open – Women's draws and results at the International Tennis Federation

Women's singles
Australian Open (tennis) by year – Women's singles
2000 in Australian women's sport